Kentucky Route 164 (KY 164) is a  state highway in Kentucky. It runs from U.S. Route 68 (US 68), KY 80, and Old Canton Road Connector in Canton to KY 272 west of Hopkinsville

Major intersections

References

0164
Kentucky Route 164
Kentucky Route 164